Khomeygan (also Romanized as Khomeygān) is a village in Razan Rural District, in the Central District of Razan County, Hamadan Province, Iran. At the 2006 census, its population was 1,120, in 250 families.

References 

Populated places in Razan County